Pselaphaulax is a genus of beetles belonging to the family Staphylinidae.

The species of this genus are found in Europe and Australia.

Species:
 Pselaphaulax antipodum (Westwood, 1856) 
 Pselaphaulax articularis (Schaufuss, 1877)

References

Staphylinidae
Staphylinidae genera